New Masters is the second studio album by singer-songwriter Cat Stevens, released in December 1967 by Deram Records (a new subsidiary of Decca Records) as a follow up to the highly successful debut album, Matthew and Son.

Overview
The label was disappointed by Cat Stevens' second album's poor sales, given that the previous album made the UK Top Ten and produced several hit singles.  New Masters generated little interest, failing to chart in either the UK or the United States. The single "Kitty"/"Blackness of the Night" languished at number 47, becoming Stevens' first single to miss the top 40. This was a sudden and steep commercial decline from the considerable success that Stevens enjoyed with his earlier recordings.

"The First Cut Is the Deepest" has been covered successfully by several artists. Prior to the release of New Masters, Stevens had sold the song for £30 to P. P. Arnold (formerly of the Ike and Tina Turner Revue) which gave the former Ikette her first UK hit. In the decades to come it would also be a hit for Rod Stewart, Sheryl Crow, James Morrison and Keith Hampshire. Hampshire's version reached no. 1 on the Canadian charts in 1973. Other versions have been rendered by singer Barbara Jones, Colm Wilkinson of Les Misérables and Jesus Christ Superstar fame, Duffy and the Jools Holland Rhythm & Blues Orchestra.

Track listing

Personnel 
 Cat Stevens – vocals, guitars, keyboards
 Chris Hunt – drums 
 Herbie Flowers – bass
 Arthur Greenslade, Lew Warburton, Ivor Raymonde – music direction

References 

Cat Stevens albums
1967 albums
Deram Records albums